The Webster Street Firehouse is a historic fire station at 40 Webster Street in Worcester, Massachusetts.  The brick -story building was built in 1893 to a design by the local architectural firm of E. Boyden & Son.  Its main facade is visually eclectic, with yellow brick and terracotta elements, brick pilasters topped with foliate decoration, and an arched window surmounted by a tower with iron cresting.  There is a central four sided tower with open belfry that is topped by a steeply pitched roof.

The building was listed on the National Register of Historic Places in 1980. It was demolished circa 2000, a new fire station was built in its place.

See also
National Register of Historic Places listings in southwestern Worcester, Massachusetts
National Register of Historic Places listings in Worcester County, Massachusetts

References

Fire stations completed in 1893
Fire stations on the National Register of Historic Places in Massachusetts
Buildings and structures in Worcester, Massachusetts
National Register of Historic Places in Worcester, Massachusetts
1893 establishments in Massachusetts